Teach Me to Love is a studio album by American recording artist Wanda Jackson. It was released in 1984 via Vine Records and contained 11 tracks. It was the thirty first studio recording of her career and was a collection of gospel songs. It was also her first album to issued with the Vine label.

Background, content and release
During the early part of her career, Wanda Jackson became among the first women to have commercial success in the country and Rockabilly music genres. She had a series of singles in both genres, such as "Fujiyama Mama", "Let's Have a Party", "In the Middle of a Heartache" and "Tears Will Be the Chaser for Your Wine". In the 1970s, she left her long-time label to pursue gospel music and recorded a series of albums in that style. Jackson continued recording gospel into the early 1980s on a series of labels, which included the Vine record company. Teach Me to Love was recorded in August 1984 at the Associated Recording Studio in Oklahoma City, Oklahoma. It was produced by Gregg Gray.

Teach Me to Love consisted of 11 gospel recordings. The album's material was a mixture of new recordings and cover versions of previously-recorded songs. Included was Jackson's cover of the Cristy Lane country hit "One Day at a Time", which was written by Kris Kristofferson and Marijohn Wilkin. Also included was a re-recorded version of "Jesus Put a Yodel in My Soul". The song's original recording was first released on Jackson's 1975 album Now I Have Everything. Country performer Leon McAuliffe is also featured on the album. Teach Me to Love was released on Vine Records in 1984 as a vinyl LP. It marked Jackson's thirty first studio album in her career. In 1988, it was re-released under the title Country Gospel in Switzerland.

Track listing

Personnel
All credits are adapted from the liner notes of Teach Me to Love.

Musical personnel
 Ken Collins – Steel guitar
 Gregg Gray – Background vocals, piano
 Rocky Gribble – Banjo
 Billy Hamblin – Fiddle
 Wanda Jackson – Lead vocals
 Paul Kilpatrick – Strings
 Melodee Liston – Background vocals
 Leon McAuliffe – Steel guitar
 Carolyn McCoy – Background vocals
 Dale McCoy – Background vocals
 Nancy Nering – Strings
 Ray Owen – Harmonica
 Mike Reaves – Strings
 Dave Robilland – Strings
 Cathy Sack – Strings
 Mike Shelton – Background vocals
 Marty Shrabel – Bass
 Lynn Williams – Drums 
 John Wilson – Strings

Technical personnel
 Jeff Cherry – Cover photography
 Wendell Goodman – Production coordinator
 Gregg Gray – Arrangement, producer
 Rand E. Hudson – Cover art and design
 Stephen J. Scott – Executive producer
 Marty Shrabel – Recording and mixing
 Lynn Williams – Percussion

Release history

References

1984 albums
1988 albums
Wanda Jackson albums